Elves' Hill is a comedy by Johan Ludvig Heiberg, with overture and incidental music by Friedrich Kuhlau (Op. 100), which is considered the first Danish national play.

History
Elves' Hill was commissioned by Frederik VI for the wedding of his daughter Vilhelmine Marie and Frederik Carl Christian (later Frederik VII) and premiered on 6 November 1828, 5 days after the wedding. Since the premiere, the play has been performed more than 1,000 times at the Royal Danish Theatre.

Story
The work incorporated both the texts and melodies of two traditional ballad pieces featuring folklore about the Elven king. Heiberg localized the legend of the Elven king to Stevns. To these, the motif element of the swapped children was added. King Christian IV is cast as a sort of detective, who unravels the mystery.

Music
 The two ballads used were Elvehøj (DgF 46B) which begins "Jeg lagde mit hoved til Elverhøj" (I laid my head down on Elves' Hill)" and Elveskud (DgF 47B) that begins "Herr Oluf han rider saa vide" (Sir Oluf he rideth so far-and-wide).

The work also contains "Kong Christian stod ved højen mast", which became the royal anthem of Denmark. It is set to Kuhlau's arrangement to a tune already being sung to the lyrics originally written by Johannes Ewald for an entirely different play. However Elves' Hill is considered instrumental to the romantic popularity of the anthem.

In popular culture 
In the eighth Olsen-banden movie (Olsen-banden ser rødt), the Olsen gang bombs, drills, and hammers its way through an opera house's basement in synchronicity with the music of the Elverhøj Overture.

Footnotes

References

External links
 

Plays by Johan Ludvig Heiberg
Compositions by Friedrich Kuhlau
19th-century Danish plays
Plays set in Denmark
Plays set in the 17th century
Cultural depictions of Christian IV of Denmark
Fantasy theatre
Elves in popular culture
1828 plays